Katherine L. Milkman is an American economist who is the James G. Dinan endowed Professor at The Wharton School of the University of Pennsylvania. She is the President of the Society for Judgment and Decision Making.

Early life and education 
Milkman originally considered working on Wall Street, and spent her college holidays interning at investment banks. She was an undergraduate student at Princeton University, where she specialised in Operations Research and American studies. She moved to Harvard University for her graduate studies and completed a doctorate in information and technology in 2009.

Research and career 
Milkman moved to the University of Pennsylvania, where she was made Assistant Professor. She was promoted to Professor of Operations, Information and Decisions in 2018. She studies how economics and psychology can be used to change behaviour, including opinions on exercise, vaccine take-up and discrimination. Milkman makes use of big data to document this behavioural change in an effort to understand what results in failures of self-control.

During the COVID-19 pandemic, Milkman investigated the transmission of coronavirus disease, claiming that it relied on social habits that can be changed. She used her understanding of vaccine hesitancy to encourage people to accept the COVID-19 vaccine. She argued that getting people to wear masks would have been easier if people had considered them as fashion items as opposed to a burden.

Awards and honors 
 2015 Associations in Behavioural & Brain Sciences Early Career Award from the Federation
 2017 Finalist for Thinkers50
 2019 Society for Personality and Social Psychology Robert B. Cialdini Prize
 2019 Elected Fellow of the Association for Psychological Science
 2020 Forbes 10 Behavioural Scientists You Should Know

Selected publications

Bibliography

References

External links 

 
 
 

Living people
Year of birth missing (living people)
University of Pennsylvania faculty
Princeton University alumni
Harvard University alumni
American economists
American women economists
21st-century American women